The Tbilisi Metro is a rapid transit system in the Georgian capital Tbilisi. Opened on 11 January 1966, it was the fourth metro system in the former Soviet Union. Like other ex-Soviet metros, most of the stations are very deep and vividly decorated.

At present the system consists of two lines,  in total length, serving 23 stations. In 2017, the Metro transported 113.827 million passengers. The Metro is operated by the Tbilisi Transport Company, which began operation the same year as the Tbilisi Metro, in 1966.

History
Tbilisi (officially known as Tiflis until 1936), the capital of Georgia, was considered historically to be one of the most important cities of the Soviet Union, particularly because of its political position as being the most significant city in the Caucasus and the capital of the Transcaucasian Socialist Federative Soviet Republic which lasted until 1936. The city grew quite rapidly during the 19th and 20th centuries, and apart from being a cultural and political centre, it was an important transport hub in Transcaucasia and an industrial centre as well. 
Features of the historically established development of Tbilisi, stretching for more than 25 km along the Mtkvari river, densely built-up city centre, and narrow steep streets in some parts of the city, impede the development of land transport. All this contributed to the need for a rapid transit Metro system. Especially considering its geographic characteristic - Tbilisi is considerably long, which undoubtedly would simplify the coverage of most parts of the city by the underground.

Construction began in 1952. Tbilisi was one of the few cities in the former USSR where work on the Metro system started before the population reached one million people. A population of over a million people was one of the main requirements for Soviet cities to build a metro system.

On 11 January 1966, the Tbilisi Metro was opened: it was the first and only Metro system in Georgia and the fourth one in the former Soviet Union (after Moscow, Saint Petersburg, and Kyiv) when the first six stations were opened. Since then, the system has steadily grown to a two-line, 23-station network.

Post Soviet Era
During the 1990s, most of the Soviet-era station names were changed, although financial difficulties after the breakup of the Soviet Union hit the Metro particularly hard in its infrastructure, operations, and extensions. In the early-mid 1990s, the Tbilisi metro was usually not working due to the lack of electricity. Until recently, the Metro had been underfunded and operated in severe difficulties due to poor electrical supply. It had also become infamous for widespread petty crime, like pickpocketing and mugging. In addition, there have been several incidents at metro stations in recent years. On 9 October 1997, a former policeman blew himself up at Didube station. On 14 February 2000, a teenager threw a homemade hand grenade into a metro station, injuring several people. In March 2004, several people were poisoned by an unidentified gas while using the Metro. However, crime has reduced as a result of security and administration reforms in the system from 2004 to 2005. Other services have also significantly improved.

Modernization Efforts
The Tbilisi Metro system is undergoing a major rehabilitation effort, including the reconstruction of the stations as well as the modernization of trains and other facilities. The city's 2006 budget allocated 16 million lari for this project. Former President of Georgia Mikheil Saakashvili promised to make the Metro a most prestigious public transport system, and charged the Director General of Tbilisi Metro, Zurab Kikalishvili, in late 2005, to bring the metro up to European standards by 2007. In 2005 began the renovation process of subway trains. As part of the modernization, the soviet-era rolling stock was overhauled, old parts were replaced with new ones, the interior of the car was changed and the exterior was given a different look. Additionally, the driver cab was equipped with a modern control panel.
In subsequent years, however, the upgrade process slowed significantly, and as of July 2010, the Tbilisi metro rail was still far from its target standard. Some renovated metro stations had to be repaired again soon due to deficient planning and poor quality of the renovation. The renovation process of the system continues unfortunately slowly and there are several stations under renovation.  Tbilisi City Hall purchased 10 4-car trains for Tbilisi Metro from Metrowagonmash, which will meet European standards.  

The extension of the Saburtalo Line to State University station began in 1985. In 1993 the construction was stopped and it went into conservation mode. In January 2012 construction was scheduled to start on a frozen extension of the Saburtalo Line from the Vazha-Pshavela station to the Sakhelmtsipo Universiteti (State University) station, of which 80% of the work was completed during the Soviet era. But it was only restarted in July 2015 with financial help from the Asian Development Bank and the station was finally opened to the public on 16 October 2017. The new State University station meets modern standards and is equipped with new technologies. Additionally, the Delisi-Vazha-Pshavela tunnel was also opened.

In 2019, the complete rehabilitation of power lines and ventilation systems in the metro began. With the replacement of the  power cable, 32 new European-standard fans will be installed. The Asian Development Bank has allocated $15 million for this project.

The government of Tbilisi, through partial funding from the European Bank for Reconstruction and Development, spent more than 48 million Euros on purchasing 44, new, modern metro cars or 10 train sets in February 2023 from Metrowagonmash, bringing the system's outdated rolling stock up to date. Moreover, the depot and the connecting tunnel will be rehabilitated as a part of the project to support the new trains. This is the first major rolling stock update for the network since it began operation more than 50 years ago.

Network

 Current lines

Timeline

Operation

Of the 23 stations, 21 stations are below ground and two are surface level. Of the subterranean stations, 17 are deep level and 4 are shallows. The former comprises 6 pylon stations, 5 columns and 6 single vaults (built to the Leningrad Technology). The shallow stations consist of three pillar trepans and one single vault (Kharkiv Technology). Due to Tbilisi's uneven landscape, the Metro, particularly the Akhmeteli-Varketili line, has one surface-level section.

An estimated total of 105.6 million people used the Metro annually as of 2005, though the actual figure by 2012  was closer to 94 million. Carrying them are a fleet of 170 Soviet-built rail cars, consisting of the 81–717/714 and Еzh3 models, which have been modernised since 2000 (using the Czech blueprint of the 81-71M) and operate from two depots. Station platforms are approximately 102 meters in length, and built to accommodate five-carriage trains, though four-car trains operate on both lines of the subway system.

Trains run from a little before 6:00 am (exact times vary depending on the station) until midnight, with intervals ranging between  minutes at peak times and 12 minutes later in the night. Train speeds are 60–80 kilometres per hour, while the average trip speed is slightly over 33 kilometres per hour.

As of 2018 due to the State University (Tbilisi Metro) extension, new digital signaling system were installed by Siemens, controlling 2.6 km of track and three interlockings, from Delisi to State University (Tbilisi Metro), which is the only segment in the network containing Signaling systems from the post-Soviet era.

Fares
The Tbilisi Metro uses a flat-fare system of 1 lari per journey. Tokens are no longer used, and riders must purchase for 2 lari a Metromoney Card (a stored value card available at metro stations), onto which they can add fares. The card allows riders to re-enter the system for 90 minutes upon leaving it at no charge.

Future
The system had also an advanced extension plan, with a third line, amongst other locations, encompassing the district of Vake. Forming a typical Soviet triangle with a three-line six radii layout intersecting in the city centre. However, most of the construction sites remain frozen, some dating to Soviet times.

There are also plans to return a tram network in Tbilisi.

New Metro Line
In October 2018, the Prime Minister of Georgia, Mamuka Bakhtadze announced during the Georgian Dream conference that 7 new stations will form a new line connecting central Tbilisi with the outskirts of the city and Tbilisi Shota Rustaveli Airport. According to the plan, the new overground line will run from Samgori metro station to the Lilo market in the east of the city, and was planned to be opened in 2020. As of present day, the project has not been started. The new metro line was planned to use Light Rail Vehicles running at 10 minute intervals for both directions. The mayor Kakha Kaladze added, that the line is planned to be extended to Rustavi, a major city 30 km away from the capital. Although, this remains a plan up until the overground line is open.

Rolling Stock Upgrades 
In October 2022, EBRD worked with the Tbilisi Mayor's Office to start and fund a project to renovate the above ground infrastructure of 11 Metro stations, adapting them to be wheelchair accessible.
Along with this plan, 4 Metro stations are to have new entrances constructed. Over 50 million euros were approved for this project.

See also
 List of Tbilisi Metro stations
 List of metro systems
 Trams in Tbilisi

References

External links

 Tbilisi Transport Company – official Metro website 
 Tbilisi at UrbanRail.net 
 Tbilisi at Metroworld 
 Tbilisi Metro at cityrailtransit.com  
 Metrosoyuza 
 Tbilisi Metro 
 Metasubway Tbilisi 

 
Underground rapid transit in Georgia (country)
Transport in Tbilisi